EPZ may refer to:

 Elektriciteits Produktiemaatschappij Zuid-Nederland, an operator of coal and nuclear power plants
 Emergency Planning Zone, a zone (amongst a number of zones) defined around a nuclear power plant or other extremely high-safety installation defined in order to facilitate evacuation and other emergency measures in case of an incident with off-site contamination
 Equipotential zone, an area of equal potential to protect workers on electrical equipment from electric shock
 Export processing zone, a specific class of special economic zone